George Forrest VC (1800 – 3 November 1859) was born St Michael's, Dublin and was an Irish recipient of the Victoria Cross, the highest and most prestigious award for gallantry in the face of the enemy that can be awarded to British and Commonwealth forces.

Details
Forrest was about 57 years old, and a lieutenant in the Bengal Veteran Establishment, Bengal Army during the Indian Mutiny when the following deed took place on 11 May 1857 at Delhi, India for which he was awarded the VC.

Lieutenant Forrest was one of nine men who defended the Magazine for more than five hours against large numbers of rebels, until, on the wall being scaled and there being no hope of help, they fired the Magazine. Five of the defending band died in the explosion and one shortly afterwards, but many of the enemy were killed. See also John Buckley and William Raynor. His citation in the London Gazette reads:

Forrest later achieved the rank of captain and died at Dehra Dun, India, on 3 November 1859.

References

Listed in order of publication year 
The Register of the Victoria Cross (1981, 1988 and 1997)

Ireland's VCs (Dept of Economic Development, 1995)
Monuments to Courage (David Harvey, 1999)
Irish Winners of the Victoria Cross (Richard Doherty & David Truesdale, 2000)

1800 births
1859 deaths
19th-century Irish people
Irish soldiers in the British East India Company Army
Military personnel from Dublin (city)
Irish recipients of the Victoria Cross
British East India Company Army officers
Indian Rebellion of 1857 recipients of the Victoria Cross